The third competition weekend of the 2011–12 ISU Speed Skating World Cup was held in the Thialf arena in Heerenveen, Netherlands, from Friday, 2 December, until Sunday, 4 December 2011.

Schedule of events
The schedule of the event is below:

Medal summary

Men's events

Women's events

Notes

 The team sprint events were included as demonstration events.

References

External links

3
Isu World Cup, 2011-12, 3
ISU Speed Skating World Cup, 2011-12, World Cup 3